Nathan Ngai (born 3 April 1989) is a Hong Kong actor.

Early career
Ngai graduated in TVB's graduating acting class of 2009.
Ngai is best known for his role Cheung Yat Hong in the drama The Hippocratic Crush on 2012

TV series

Movies

Personal life

He played the viola in high school, but dropped out of the orchestra after a string of poor performances.

External links
 at Weibo
 at Facebook
 at Instagram

1989 births
Living people
Hong Kong male actors